Francis Akwaffo-Boateng (born September 7, 1991, in Anum) is a Ghanaian footballer who plays for Al Nasr Benghazi.

Career
He began his career in the youth from Larteh United and joined than in 2004 to Ba United. After two big seasons with Ba United, he was transferred on 24 October 2007 to Asante Kotoko. The right winger started on 15 July 2009 a one-week trial with Germany-based club FSV Frankfurt and turned later back to Asante Kotoko.

International career
Akwaffo is former member of the Black Meteors.

References

1991 births
Living people
Ghanaian footballers
Association football midfielders
Asante Kotoko S.C. players
Al-Nasr SC (Benghazi) players
Ghanaian expatriate footballers
Expatriate footballers in Egypt
Expatriate footballers in Libya
Libyan Premier League players